Faith Margaret Ellen Bennett (1903–1969) was a British actress and ATA pilot.

Biography 
Bennett was born Margaret Ellen Riddick on 12 May 1903 in London, England. One of her brothers died during the First World War.

In 1930, she married film writer Charles Alfred Selwyn Bennett, and over the course of the 1930s she starred in multiple British films under the stage name Faith Bennett. Bennett took flying lessons at the Northampton School of flying, Sywell, her instructor was  the famous WWI flying Ace Tommy Rose DFC, she took these lessons alongside  her acting career, earning both a British aviator's certificate and an American flying license (the couple moved to the U.S. briefly while Charles worked for Universal Studios).

In July 1941, Bennett joined the ATA. She received her training and was assigned to No. 5 Ferry Pilot Pool (F.P.P.) in December that year, and only two days later was forced to make a crash landing due to poor weather and a stalled engine. Bennett sustained "slight injuries", and was afterwards assigned to the Hamble Ferry Pool. She remained with the ATA until July 1945.

After the WW2 she divorced Charles Bennett and married fellow ATA pilot Herbert Henry Newmark in 1946.

Bennett died in 1969.

The British Women Pilots' Association named the Faith Bennett Navigation Cup after her, and the trophy is still awarded annually to women pilots of special merit.

Filmography
 The Officers' Mess (1931)
 Mannequin (1932)
 Eyes of Fate (1933)
 The Pride of the Force (1933)
 Hawley's of High Street (1933)
 Seeing Is Believing (1934)
 Master and Man (1934)
 One Good Turn (1936)

References

Bibliography
 Brown, Geoff. Launder and Gilliat. British Film Institute, 1977.

External links

1969 deaths
British film actresses
British stage actresses
Actresses from London
British World War II pilots
British women in World War II
Air Transport Auxiliary pilots
British aviators
1903 births
Women aviators
20th-century British actresses
20th-century English women
20th-century English people